Statistics of Swedish football Division 2 for the 1955–56 season.

League standings

Norrland

Svealand

Östra Götaland

Västra Götaland

Allsvenskan promotion playoffs 
IK Brage - IFK Malmö 2-3 (0-1, 2-2)
Lycksele IF - GAIS  0-10 (0-2, 0-8)

IFK Malmö and GAIS promoted to Allsvenskan.

References
Sweden - List of final tables (Clas Glenning)

Swedish Football Division 2 seasons
2
Sweden